The Mutumui  were an indigenous Australian people of northern Queensland.

Language
The name of the Mutumui language, now extinct, was Eibole, of which a dialect called Ongwara ('northern talk') was spoken to their north.

Country
The Mutumui's traditional territory spread out over an estimated , covering the area of Bathurst Bay and Cape Melville southwards, at Barrow Point and the vicinity of the Starcke and Jeannie Rivers.

Social organization and people
The Mutumui were divided into several hordes/bands, each speaking a distinct dialect version of Mutumui, and of which the probable names of two are known:-
 Karbungga. This was the band at the Jeannie River
 Mbambylmu. at Jack River.
 Ithu?

Though tooth avulsion was practiced in the area, among the Mutumui is reported to have formed part of the initiatory ceremony itself.

The Mutumui were essentially shore dwellers, mainly in the area around Murdoch Point and Bathurst Bay. They would make forays into the sandstone hinterland on occasion in pursuit of honey, and to hunt opossums and rock wallabies.

History
The Palmer river goldrush following from its discovery in the area 1873 led to a large influx of people seeking to pan for quick riches during the decade of the 1870s, and this surge led to conflict and massacres during the subsequent occupation of the general region just south of the Mutumui. The Aboriginal sacred sites at Clack Island were ransacked for objects from the indigenous cultural patrimony, which included sacred bark paintings, when the physician and naturalist Richard Coppinger on board the British Royal Navy sloop, . Punitive expeditions in the area were carried out following the discovery of Mary Watson's remains in 1882. She had been on Lizard Island and after clashes with local aborigines, which led to the spearing of speared her Chinese cook, led to punitive expeditions against the natives through this area in the early 1880s. Reports of this would have reached the Mutumui and Ithu nearby.

Alternative names and spellings
 Mutumi.
 Baulam. (Bakanambia exonym)
 Karbungga.
 Eibole.
 Ongwara.
 Jugaiwatha.
 Mbambylmu.

Notes

Citations

Sources

Aboriginal peoples of Queensland